Schxxl Out (stylized as SCHXXL OUT) is the second and final extended play by South Korean girl group Pristin. It was released on August 23, 2017, by Pledis Entertainment and distributed by LOEN Entertainment. The EP consists of five songs, including the single "We Like", which also had a music video released on August 23. The group performed in various Korean music shows to promote the album. This is their last album before their disbandment in May 2019.

Background 
After ending the promotions for their debut mini album Hi! Pristin, the group went on hiatus, until on May 22, through a Facebook live stream with the Chinese entertainment website Idols of Asia, they revealed their plans to make a comeback during the summer.

Release 
On August 5, the timetable for their comeback was unveiled, confirming the mini album to be released on August 23. The tracklist for the EP was unveiled on August 18. Finally, on August 23, the Schxxl Out was officially released through several digital retailers, including Melon in South Korea, and iTunes for the global market. Physically, the album came out in two versions, the "In" version features a high school concept, while the "Out" version features an after school concept. A music video for the title track "We Like" was also released on the same day.

Promotion 
On August 23, Pristin held a showcase to promote the mini album, where they performed the songs "We Like" and "Aloha". The following day, on August 24, they made their first comeback stage on Mnet's M Countdown, performing the same songs as the showcase. The promotions continued through KBS's Music Bank on August 25, MBC's Show! Music Core on August 26, SBS's Inkigayo on August 27, SBS MTV's The Show on August 29, and MBC Music's Show Champion'''s on August 30.

 Commercial performance Schxxl Out'' debuted on the Gaon Album Chart at number 4 on the issue dated between August 20 and August 26, 2017. In the week of September 9, 2017, the album entered the Billboard's World Albums Chart at number 5. It also appeared at number 116 on the Oricon Albums Chart.

Track listing 
Credits adapted from Naver.

Charts

Weekly charts

Release history

References

2017 EPs
Dance-pop EPs
K-pop EPs
Korean-language EPs
Kakao M EPs
Pristin albums
Hybe Corporation EPs